The First Seven Days is an album recorded by jazz musician Jan Hammer in 1975. It features extensive use of synthesizers, including the synthesized "guitar" parts (as on his follow-up album, Oh Yeah?), with the record jacket stating, "For those concerned: there is no guitar on this album." Other instruments used are grand piano, electric violin and percussion.

It is a musical telling of the Genesis creation story. The record jacket continues with "Assuming that each of these "days" lasted anywhere from one day to a hundred million years, the scientific and biblical views do meet in certain points. These points were the inspiration for this album, and, besides, they provided me with an excuse to write seven new pieces of music."

Track listing
All tracks composed by Jan Hammer
(On the LP version, side 2 begins with track 5.)
"Darkness/Earth in Search of a Sun" (4:30)
"Light/Sun" (6:40)
"Oceans and Continents" (6:14)
"Fourth Day — Plants and Trees" (2:44)
"The Animals" (6:09)
"Sixth Day — the People" (7:11)
"The Seventh Day" (6:08)

Personnel
Jan Hammer - producer, engineer, piano, electric piano, Moog synthesizer, Oberheim synthesizer and digital sequencer, drums, percussion, Freeman string synthesizer (sic), Mellotron
David Earle Johnson - congas & percussion (tracks 5 and 6)
Steven Kindler - violin (tracks 2, 5, 6, and 7)

Production
Recorded at Red Gate Studios, Kent, New York
Andy Topeka - assistant engineer, custom audio installations
Milton Glaser - cover illustration
Paula Scher - art direction

References

The First Seven Days, Jan Hammer. Nemperor/Atlantic NE432 (jacket notes)

External links 

Jan Hammer albums
1975 albums
Concept albums
Albums with cover art by Milton Glaser
Atlantic Records albums